Robert McElhiney James (born December 25, 1939) is an American jazz keyboardist, arranger, and record producer. He founded the band Fourplay and wrote "Angela", the theme song for the TV show Taxi. According to VICE (magazine), music from his first seven albums has often been sampled and believed to have contributed to the formation of hip hop. Among his most well known recordings are "Nautilus", "Westchester Lady", "Tappan Zee", and his version of "Take Me to The Mardi Gras".

Early life and family
James was born on Christmas Day of 1939 in Marshall, Missouri, United States. He started playing the piano at age four. His first piano teacher, Sister Mary Elizabeth, who taught at Mercy Academy, discovered that he had perfect pitch. At age seven, James began to study with R. T. Dufford, a teacher at Missouri Valley College. At age 15, James continued his studies with Franklin Launer, a teacher at Christian College in Columbia, Missouri, with more music instruction during high school from Harold Lickey, conductor of the Marshall High School Band and Orchestra. Apart from the piano, James learned to play trumpet, timpani, and percussion. From 1950 to 1956, he competed in the Missouri State Fair piano competitions and received several blue ribbons.

James attended the University of Michigan, but during his second year transferred to Berklee College of Music in Boston, Massachusetts. At Berklee his roommate was saxophonist Nick Brignola.

Music career
His first professional music job was when he was eight years old, playing for a tap dance class at Mercy Academy. During his adolescence, James's music career proliferated. Early jobs included being a member of the Earle Parsons Dance Band (c. 1952–55) which played various engagements around the Marshall area. During this time, he penned his first dance band arrangement.

During the summer of 1955, at Lake of the Ozarks in Missouri, James played for dancing and occasional jam sessions with the Bob Falkenhainer Quartet on the Governor McClurg Excursion Boat in the evenings. He recalls that "during the day we had free time and I became a proficient water skier that summer!" At age 16, a solo engagement followed in the summer when James traveled with good friend Ben Swinger to Colorado and ended up with a job in the piano bar at the Steads Ranch resort in Estes Park.

Discovery by Quincy Jones
While in college at Michigan, James played free jazz with musicians in Ann Arbor and Detroit. In 1962, his band entered the Notre Dame Collegiate Jazz Festival, where the judges included Henry Mancini and Quincy Jones. The trio entered the competition not expecting to win but wanting to provide some avant-garde music in a contest field that was primarily straight ahead music. To the trio's surprise, they won the competition. Not long after, Jones signed James to an album deal with Mercury Records. Mercury released James's first album, Bold Conceptions (1963), a free jazz exploration that was produced by Quincy Jones and that differed from the smooth jazz for which he would later become known.

In New York City, James worked as an arranger and was hired as piano accompanist for jazz singer Sarah Vaughan. He reunited with Quincy Jones when Jones asked him to do some arranging for studio sessions. Creed Taylor, producer and founder of CTI Records, was at the sessions and hired James to work for CTI as a producer, arranger, and studio musician. In the 1970s, James worked on albums by Gabor Szabo, Milt Jackson, Stanley Turrentine, Grover Washington, Jr., and Maynard Ferguson.

Solo albums and collaborations

Creed Taylor invited James to record a solo album. The result, One (CTI, 1974), contained the song "Feel Like Making Love", with which Roberta Flack had already had a hit. James had been hired to play piano for the song on Roberta Flack's album two weeks before recording a version of his own, using the same band. Radio stations played both and contributed to the commercial success of One. The album was notable for adapting classical music to a modern-day scene, e.g. "In The Garden" was based on Pachelbel's Canon in D and "Night on Bald Mountain" was a cover of Modest Mussorgsky's composition of the same name.

After three solo albums, James founded his own record label, Tappan Zee. Immediately thereafter, he cut a disco version of the Theme to Star Trek: The Motion Picture a 45 of which was included with the soundtrack LP and recorded the album Touchdown (Tappan Zee, 1978). Among the songs on the album was "Angela", the theme song for the TV show Taxi. James provided all the music for Taxi and collected some of its music, including "Angela", on The Genie: Themes & Variations from the TV Series Taxi (1983). When he toured in 1979, he was supported by a marketing campaign that included posters of him at the wheel of a New York yellow cab. The performances were documented on the album All Around the Town (Tappan Zee, 1980), with a cover of James at the wheel of a taxi.

James turned from smooth jazz to classical music to record Rameau (1984), his interpretations of Baroque-period composer Jean-Philippe Rameau. In later albums, he interpreted the work of two more Baroque composers, J. S. Bach and Domenico Scarlatti.

A year after Rameau, he collaborated with David Sanborn on Double Vision (Warner Bros, 1986). The album won a Grammy Award for Best Jazz Fusion Performance. His collaboration with Earl Klugh, One on One, won a Grammy Award for Best Pop Instrumental Performance in 1980 and has sold over one million copies. Another collaboration with Klugh, Cool, (Warner Bros., 1992) was nominated for a Grammy, as was Joined at the Hip (Warner Bros., 1996) with Kirk Whalum, recorded Flesh and Bone in 1995 and another solo album, Joyride (Warner Bros., 1999). Joined at the Hip will be reissued with a 2019 Remaster on evosound.

Fourplay
James was looking for a bass player while recording the album Grand Piano Canyon (Warner Bros., 1990) with drummer Harvey Mason and guitarist Lee Ritenour. Mason and Ritenour suggested Nathan East. After working with them for a while, James suggested they form a band, which resulted in the contemporary jazz quartet Fourplay. The band has recorded over ten albums and has seen a couple of personnel changes, with guitarist Larry Carlton replacing Ritenour and then Chuck Loeb replacing Carlton. Fourplay celebrated its 25th anniversary with the album Silver (Heads Up, 2015).

Influence in hip hop
James's music, especially his early albums, has been sampled often, with his songs "Nautilus" and "Take Me to the Mardi Gras" leading the field.

Selected songs that use James’s music

"Nautilus" was sampled by Eric B. & Rakim in "Let the Rhythm Hit 'em", Run-D.M.C.'s "Beats to the Rhyme", Ghostface Killah's "Daytona 500", DJ Jazzy Jeff's "Jazzie's Groove", Jeru the Damaja's "My Mind Spray", Freddie Gibbs's "Extradite", and "Farandole (L'Arlesienne Suite No. 2)". It appears on the Funcrusher Plus LP from Company Flow and Nangdo's "Nikes". The bassline from "Nautilus" appears in "Children's Story" by Slick Rick.

"Take Me to the Mardi Gras" incorporates in its first four measures a bell-and-drum pattern that is one of hip hop's basic break beats. It has been sampled by Crash Crew's "Breaking Bells (Take Me to the Mardi Gras)", Run-D.M.C.'s "Peter Piper", LL Cool J's "Rock the Bells", the Beastie Boys' "Hold it Now, Hit it", Missy Elliott's "Work It", will.i.am's "I Got it from My Mama", "This Is Me (Urban Remix)" by Dream, "I Want You" by Common, and "Take It Back" by Wu-Tang Clan.

"Westchester Lady" was sampled by DJ Jazzy Jeff & the Fresh Prince in "Here We Go Again", as well as by DJ T-Rock and Squashy Nice in their song "Evolution".

James's 1981 song "Sign of the Times" was sampled by Warren G and Nate Dogg in their 1994 single "Regulate".

His 1980 song "Snowbird Fantasy" was sampled by French house musician and Le Knight Club member Eric Chedeville, also Known as "Rico the Wizard", in his 2009 single "Spell of Love", which was remixed later by DJ Sneak.

The track "Tappan Zee", an ode to James' record label of the same name, was sampled in Arrested Development's "People Everyday (Metamorphis Remix)".

In the past, James has stated that he had "a lot of respect" for the creative process of hip hop production, only being unhappy when his music was plagiarized or illegally sampled. James has begun to sample his own music, as shown on the composition "Submarine". He has also been collaborating in recent years with DJ Jazzy Jeff, Ghostface Killah, 9th Wonder, and Slick Rick.

Awards and honors
 Grammy Award for Best Pop Instrumental Performance, with Earl Klugh, One on One (1979)
 Grammy Award for Best Jazz Fusion Performance, Vocal or Instrumental, with David Sanborn, Double Vision (1986)
 Grammy nomination, Cool with Earl Klugh (1992)
 Grammy nomination, Joined at the Hip with Kirk Whalum (1996)
 Grammy nomination, Joyride (1999)
 George Benson Lifetime Achievement Award (2006)
 Grammy nomination for Best Pop Instrumental, "Fortune Teller" by Fourplay (2008)
 International Achievement Award, State of Michigan (2008)
 Best Group of the Year nomination, American Smooth Jazz Awards, Fourplay (2010)
 Grammy nomination for Best Arrangement, Instrumental or A Cappella, "Ghost of a Chance" (2016)

Discography

As leader 
 Bold Conceptions (Mercury, 1963) – rec. 1962
 Explosions (ESP Disk, 1965)
 One (CTI, 1974; Tappan Zee/Columbia, 1981)
 Two (CTI, 1975; Tappan Zee/Columbia, 1981)
 Three (CTI, 1976; Tappan Zee/Columbia, 1981) – rec. 1975–76
 BJ4 (CTI, 1977; Tappan Zee/Columbia, 1981) – rec. 1976
 Heads (Tappan Zee/Columbia, 1977)
 Touchdown (Tappan Zee/Columbia, 1978)
 Lucky Seven (Tappan Zee/Columbia, 1979)
 One on One with Earl Klugh (Tappan Zee/Columbia, 1979)
 H (Tappan Zee/Columbia, 1980)
 All Around the Town (Tappan Zee/Columbia, 1981)[2LP] – live
 Sign of the Times (Tappan Zee/Columbia, 1981)
 Hands Down (Tappan Zee/Columbia, 1982)
 Two of a Kind with Earl Klugh (Capitol, 1982)
 The Genie: Themes & Variations from the TV Series "Taxi" (Tappan Zee/Columbia, 1983)
 Foxie (Tappan Zee/Columbia, 1983)
 Rameau (CBS Masterworks, 1984)
 12 (Tappan Zee/Columbia, 1984)
 The Swan (Tappan Zee/CBS/Sony [jp], 1984)
 Double Vision with David Sanborn (Warner Bros., 1986)
 Obsession (Warner Bros., 1986)
 The Scarlatti Dialogues (CBS Masterworks, 1988)
 Ivory Coast (Warner Bros., 1988)
 Concertos for Two & Three Keyboards with Guher Pekinel (CBS Masterworks, 1989)
 Grand Piano Canyon (Warner Bros., 1990)
 Cool with Earl Klugh (Warner Bros., 1992)
 Restless (Warner Bros., 1994)
 Flesh and Blood with Hilary James (Warner Bros., 1995)
 Straight Up (Warner Bros., 1996) – rec. 1995
 Joined at the Hip with Kirk Whalum (Warner Bros., 1996)
 Playin' Hooky (Warner Bros., 1997)
 Joy Ride (Warner Bros., 1999)
 Dancing on the Water (Warner Bros., 2001)
 Morning, Noon & Night (Warner Bros., 2002)
 Take It from the Top (Koch, 2004)
 Urban Flamingo (Koch, 2006)
 Angels of Shanghai (Koch, 2007)
 Christmas Eyes with Hilary James (Koch, 2008)
 Botero with Jack Lee (VideoArts [jp], 2009)
 Just Friends with Howard Paul (BJHP Music, 2011)
 Altair & Vega with Keiko Matsui (eOne Music, 2012)
 Quartette Humaine with David Sanborn (OKeh/Sony Masterworks, 2013)
 Alone: Kaleidoscope by Solo Piano (Red River, 2013)
 The New Cool with Nathan East (Yamaha, 2015)
 Live at Milliken Auditorium (Tappan Zee, 2015)
 Espresso (Evosound, 2018)
 Once Upon a Time: The Lost 1965 New York Studio Sessions (Resonance, 2020)
 On Vacation with Till Brönner (Sony Masterworks, 2020)
 Feel Like Making Live! with Billy Kilson and Michael Palazzolo (Evosound, 2022)

Singles
 "Nautilus" b/w "Submarine (Remix)" (RSD Exclusive/Limited Edition 7" Vinyl Single) (Evosound, 2020)

With Fourplay 
 Fourplay (Warner Bros., 1991) – rec. 1990-91
 Between the Sheets (Warner Bros., 1993)
 Elixir (Warner Bros., 1995)
 4 (Warner Bros., 1998)
 Snowbound (Warner Bros., 1999)
 Yes, Please! (Warner Bros., 2000)
 Heartfelt (Bluebird/RCA Victor/BMG, 2002)
 Journey (Bluebird/RCA Victor/BMG, 2004)
 X (Bluebird/RCA Victor/BMG, 2006)
 Energy (Heads Up, 2008)
 Let's Touch the Sky (Heads Up, 2010)
 Esprit De Four (Heads Up, 2012)
 Silver (Heads Up, 2015)

As sideman 

With Patti Austin
 Every Home Should Have One (Qwest, 1981)
 That Secret Place (GRP, 1994)

With Chet Baker
 Baby Breeze (Limelight, 1964)
 I/We Had a Ball (Limelight, 1965) – rec. 1964-65
 She Was Too Good to Me (CTI, 1974)
 Carnegie Hall Concert (CTI, 1975) – live rec. 1974

With George Benson
 The Other Side of Abbey Road (A&M, 1970)
 Love Remembers (Warner Bros., 1993)

With Ron Carter
 Blues Farm (CTI, 1973)
 Empire Jazz (RSO, 1980)

With Hank Crawford
 We Got a Good Thing Going (Kudu, 1972)
 Don't You Worry 'Bout a Thing (Kudu, 1974)

With Maynard Ferguson
 Primal Scream (Columbia, 1976)
 Conquistador (Columbia, 1977)

With Michael Franks
 Abandoned Garden (Warner Bros., 1995)
 Barefoot On the Beach (Windham Hill, 1999)

With Eric Gale
 Forecast (Kudu, 1973)
 Ginseng Woman (Columbia, 1977)
 Multiplication (Columbia, 1977)
 Island Breeze (Elektra Musician, 1983)

With Jeff Golub and Avenue Blue
 Naked City (Bluemoon Mesa, 1996)
 Nightlife (Bluemoon Mesa, 1997)

With Quincy Jones
 Walking in Space (A&M, 1969)
 Gula Matari (A&M, 1970)
 Smackwater Jack (A&M, 1971)
 You've Got It Bad Girl (A&M, 1973)
 Body Heat (A&M, 1974)
 I Heard That!! (A&M, 1976)[2LP] – rec. 1969-76

With Hubert Laws
 Crying Song (CTI, 1969)
 Afro-Classic (CTI, 1970)
 Morning Star (CTI, 1972)
 The Rite of Spring (CTI, 1972)
 Carnegie Hall (CTI, 1973)
 In the Beginning (CTI, 1974)
 Then There Was Light (CTI, 1974)
 The Chicago Theme (CTI, 1975)
 Romeo & Juliet (Columbia, 1976)
 The San Francisco Concert (CTI, 1977)

With Harvey Mason
 Funk in a Mason Jar (Arista, 1977)
 Groovin' You (Arista, 1979)
 Stone Mason (Alfa, 1982)
 Ratamacue (Atlantic, 1996)
 Chameleon (Columbia, 2014)

With Ralph MacDonald
 Sound of a Drum (Marlin, 1976)
 The Path (Marlin, 1978)

With Idris Muhammad
 Power of Soul (Kudu, 1974)
 My Turn (Lipstick, 1991)

With Doc Powell
 Inner City Blues (101 South, 1995)
 Life Changes (Gold Circle, 2001)

With Lee Ritenour
 Festival (GRP, 1988)
 Wes Bound (GRP, 1993)
 This Is Love (i.e. Music/Polygram, 1998)

With Gabor Szabo
 Mizrab (CTI, 1973)
 Rambler (CTI, 1974)
 Macho (Salvation, 1975)

With Stanley Turrentine
 Cherry (CTI, 1972)
 Don't Mess with Mister T. (CTI, 1973)
 The Baddest Turrentine (CTI, 1973)
 The Sugar Man (CTI, 1979)

With Grover Washington Jr.
 Inner City Blues (Kudu, 1971)
 All the King's Horses (Kudu, 1972)
 Soul Box (Kudu, 1973)
 Feels So Good (Kudu, 1975)
 Mister Magic (Kudu, 1975)

With Kirk Whalum
 Floppy Disk (Tappan Zee/Columbia, 1985)
 And You Know That! (Columbia, 1988)
 The Promise (Columbia, 1989)
 Cache (Columbia, 1993)

With John Zorn
 The Big Gundown (Nonesuch, 1986)
 Cobra (Hat Hut, 1987)
 Spillane (Nonesuch, 1987)

With others
 Amerie, Because I Love It (Columbia, 2007)
 Randy Bernsen, Music for Planets, People & Washing Machines (Zebra/MCA, 1985)
 Blood, Sweat & Tears, More Than Ever (Columbia, 1976)
 Chris Botti, Slowing Down the World (GRP, 1999)
 Eddie Brigati, Lost in the Wilderness (Elektra, 1976)
 Gary Burton, Cool Nights (GRP, 1991)
 Karen Carpenter, Karen Carpenter (A&M, 1996) – rec. 1979-80
 The Carpenters, Lovelines (A&M, 1989) – rec. 1978-80
 David Chesky, Rush Hour (Columbia, 1980)
 Merry Clayton, Keep Your Eye On the Sparrow (Ode, 1975)
 Natalie Cole, Stardust (Elektra, 1996)
 Eddie Daniels, Beautiful Love (Shanachie, 1997)
 De La Soul, De La Soul Is Dead (EastWest/Tommy Boy, 1991)
 Eumir Deodato & Airto Moreira, In Concert (CTI, 1974)
 Paul Desmond, Skylark  (CTI, 1974)
 Neil Diamond, Beautiful Noise (Columbia, 1976)
 Eric Dolphy, Other Aspects (Blue Note, 1987)
 Nathan East, Nathan East (Yamaha, 2014)
 Eliane Elias, Portrait of Bill Evans (JVC, 2004)
 Bill Evans, Push (Lipstick, 1994)
 Fania All-Stars, Rhythm Machine (Fania, 1977)
 Sam Franz, 2080 (Eight Islands, 2022)
 Roberta Flack, Feel Like Makin' Love (Atlantic, 1975)
 Aretha Franklin, Let Me in Your Life (Atlantic, 1974)
 Russ Freeman, Holiday (GRP, 1995)
 Freddie Gibbs, Shadow of a Doubt (ESGN, 2015)
 Johnny "Hammond" Smith, Higher Ground (Kudu, 1974)
 Terumasa Hino, Daydream (Flying Disk, 1980)
 Freddie Hubbard, Windjammer (Columbia, 1976)
 Jackie and Roy, Time & Love (CTI, 1972)
 Boney James & Rick Braun, Shake It Up (Warner Bros., 2000)
 J. J. Johnson & Kai Winding, Stonebone (A&M, 1970)
 Steve Khan, Tightrope (Tappan Zee/Columbia, 1977)
 Steve Khan, The Blue Man (Tappan Zee/Columbia, 1978)
 Morgana King, New Beginnings (Paramount, 1973)
 Dave Koz, A New Day (Just Koz Entertainment, 2020)
 Chuck Loeb, The Moon, the Stars and the Setting Sun (Shanachie, 1998)
 Kenny Loggins, Celebrate Me Home (Columbia, 1977)
 Kevin Mahogany, My Romance (Warner Bros., 1998)
 Keiko Matsui, Whisper from the Mirror (Countdown/Unity, 2000)
 Amanda McBroom, Midnight Matinee (Analogue, 1991)
 Gene McDaniels, Natural Juices (Ode, 1975)
 Michael McDonald, Motown (Motown, 2003)
 Dave McMurray, Peace of Mind (Hip Bop, 1999)
 Melba Moore, Peach Melba (Buddah, 1975)
 Gerry Mulligan & Chet Baker, Carnegie Hall Concert (CTI, 1975)
 Esther Phillips, Performance (Kudu, 1974)
 The Rippingtons, Life in the Tropics (Peak, 2000)
 Luis Salinas, Rosario (Universal, 2001)
 Mongo Santamaria, Red Hot (Tappan Zee/Columbia, 1979)
 Marilyn Scott, Take Me with You (Warner Bros., 1996)
 Tom Scott, New York Connection (Ode, 1975)
 Don Sebesky, Giant Box (CTI, 1973)
 Paul Simon, There Goes Rhymin' Simon (Columbia, 1973)
 Paul Simon, Still Crazy After All These Years (Columbia, 1975)
 Frank Sinatra, L.A. Is My Lady (Qwest/WB, 1984)
 Phoebe Snow, Phoebe Snow (Shelter, 1974)
 Chris Standring, Sunlight (Ultimate Vibe, 2018)
 Wayman Tisdale, Way Up! (Platinum/Rendezvous 2007)
 John Tropea, Something Old New Borrowed and Blues (VideoArts [jp], 1999)
 Phil Upchurch, Upchurch/Tennyson (Kudu, 1975)
 Luther Vandross, I Know (Virgin, 1998)
 Sarah Vaughan, Vol. 1: Night Song (Mercury, 1964)
 Dionne Warwick, Friends Can Be Lovers (Arista, 1993)
 Peter White, Playin' Favorites (Columbia, 2006) – live
 Alexander Zonjic, Romance with You (Inner City, 1988)

Filmography
 2005 Live at Montreux
 2005 Bob James: An Evening of Fourplay Vol 1 & 2
 2006 Bob James Live

References

External links
 
 Art of the States: Bob James

Taxi (TV series)
American jazz keyboardists
American jazz pianists
American male pianists
American organists
American session musicians
American television composers
Columbia Records artists
ESP-Disk artists
People from Marshall, Missouri
Jazz fusion pianists
Smooth jazz pianists
University of Michigan School of Music, Theatre & Dance alumni
Warner Records artists
1939 births
American music arrangers
MNRK Music Group artists
Grammy Award winners
Living people
People from Traverse City, Michigan
American male conductors (music)
Record producers from Missouri
Record producers from Michigan
20th-century American pianists
Jazz musicians from Michigan
Jazz musicians from Missouri
20th-century American conductors (music)
21st-century American conductors (music)
21st-century American keyboardists
21st-century American pianists
20th-century American male musicians
21st-century American male musicians
American male jazz musicians
Fourplay members
20th-century American keyboardists
Berklee College of Music alumni
CTI Records artists